Serena Dunn Lesley (née  Kamper; formerly Sinclair; March 29, 1926 – January 6, 2016) was an American journalist who was the longest serving fashion editor at the London The Daily Telegraph. Writing under the name Serena Sinclair, Lesley covered travel and fashion at The Telegraph from 1960 to 1984. She broadcast on BBC radio and television, and wrote for the Christian Science Monitor.

Lesley was known for her reporting about the revolution referred to as youthquake that occurred in fashion beginning in the 1960s and for it received Fashion Writer Of The Year Award in 1970. Her writing also reflected a new view of the consumer with more emphasis on creating a stylish wardrobe while living on a budget.

Early life and education
Serena Dunn Kamper was born in Santa Barbara, California to Margaret (Dunn) and Gustav Kamper and lived there during her childhood. Lesley was raised in the Christian Science faith. She attended Wellesley College in Massachusetts and graduated from Principia College in Illinois, a private college for Christian Scientists.

Career

Early career 
Kamper began her career at the Santa Barbara News-Press as a general reporter.

Fashion editor 
Lesley was known for her reporting about the revolution referred to as youthquake that occurred in fashion beginning in the 1960s and subsequent change back to more "pulled together" attire.  Her writing reflected a new view of the consumer of fashion with more emphasis on the practical aspects of dressing for their changing lifestyles. Her writing about fashion included reflections about the value of the clothes. Influenced by Lesley, The Telegraph began selling stylish clothes by mail order for women living on a tight budget.

Awards 
Lesley received the Fashion Writer Of The Year Award in 1970.

References 

1926 births
2016 deaths
Fashion editors
American women journalists
People from Santa Barbara, California
The Christian Science Monitor people
The Daily Telegraph people
American Christian Scientists
BBC people
American expatriates in the United Kingdom
Women magazine editors
20th-century English businesspeople
Principia College alumni